Thysanodonta cassis is a species of sea snail, a marine gastropod mollusk in the family Calliostomatidae.

Distribution
This marine species occurs off New Caledonia.

References

External links
  Vilvens, C. & Maestrati, P. (2006). New records and three new species of Thysanodonta (Gastropoda: Calliostomatidae: Thysanodontinae) from New Caledonia. Novapex. 7 (1): 1-11

cassis
Gastropods described in 2006